The Tesla Cybertruck is an upcoming battery electric light-duty truck announced by Tesla, Inc. in November 2019.

The stated goal of Tesla in developing the Cybertruck is to provide a sustainable energy substitute for the roughly 6,500 fossil-fuel-powered trucks sold per day in the United States of America.

The base price of the rear-wheel drive (RWD) model of the vehicle was announced to be US$39,900, with all-wheel drive (AWD) models starting at US$49,900. Production of the dual-motor AWD and tri-motor AWD Cybertruck were initially slated to begin in late 2021, with the RWD model release date in late 2022, but production dates were pushed back multiple times. , the start of limited production is estimated to start in mid-2023. , the start of mass production was estimated to be in 2024. However, as of February 2023, Elon Musk stated that the Cybertruck will be available later in 2023.

History 
Between the years 2012 and 2013, Elon Musk discussed the desire to build a truck with self-levelling suspension, making comparisons with a Ford F-250. In early 2014 Musk predicted 4–5 years before work could start on the product.

In mid-2016, Musk outlined the intent for a new kind of consumer pickup truck, and suggested using the same chassis for a van and a pickup truck. In late 2017, the size was estimated to be at least that of a Ford F-150, in order to be large enough to enable a "game-changing" feature. During the Tesla Semi and Tesla Roadster unveiling in November 2017, a picture of a "pickup truck that can carry a pickup truck" was displayed. Background ideas had been in preparation for nearly five years.

In late 2018, Musk anticipated a prototype to be ready to show in 2019.

In March 2019, following the Tesla Model Y launch, Elon Musk distributed a teaser image of a vehicle described as having a cyberpunk or Blade Runner style, with the form resembling a futuristic armored personnel carrier. It was rumored to be named the Model B. On November 6, 2019, Tesla filed for a trademark on "Cybrtrk", which was granted under United States Patent and Trademark Office 88682748; it was abandoned on August 10, 2020.

In late December 2019, both the Cybertruck and Tesla Cyberquad made the first appearance depicting in rapper Travis Scott's "Gang Gang" music video.

Musk also talked about the increasing the dynamic air suspension travel of the Cybertruck for better off-road performance.

In mid-2019, the towing capacity of the vehicle was stated to meet or exceed that of a Ford F-150. In June 2019, Musk noted that an amphibious vehicle design concept—based partly on Wet Nellie, the submarine car from the film The Spy Who Loved Me—was possible. Musk had bought a Wet Nellie used in the filming at a 2013 Sotheby's auction.

In response to queries for an unveiling date, Musk stated in late July 2019, "We're close, but the magic is in the final details. Maybe 2 to 3 months", indicating late 2019.  The unveiling was then scheduled for 21 November 2019 at the Tesla Design Studio, next to SpaceX headquarters in Los Angeles—the same month, year and location that the movie Blade Runner was set in. The truck was launched under a graffiti-themed logo of "Cybertruck", and a new trademark request was filed with the graffiti logo at the same time.

Unveiling 

Cybertruck was unveiled at the Tesla Design Studio in Los Angeles on 21 November 2019.  During the unveiling, Tesla claimed that the Cybertruck's "Armor Glass" windows were virtually unbreakable, but two windows shattered when Franz von Holzhausen threw a metal ball at each of them. Musk jokingly exclaimed that "the ball didn't make it through" and "we'll fix it in post". He later claimed that the windows were damaged because, in an earlier demonstration, the door was hit by a sledgehammer and that cracked the base of the glass.

At the end of the presentation, the Tesla Cyberquad, an all-terrain vehicle (ATV), was driven onto the bed of the Cybertruck using built-in ramps in the tailgate. The Cyberquad was plugged into the Cybertruck's onboard power outlet to charge the Cyberquad's batteries. The ATV will be available for sale as an optional package with the Cybertruck.

Many social media commentators disliked the sharp contours and unusual exterior. Tesla, Inc. stock declined 6% following the announcement.

On 23 November 2019, Musk tweeted that Tesla had received 146,000 pre-orders in the first 1.5 days after the unveiling—each requiring a  refundable deposit—with 42% choosing the dual-motor configuration, 41% choosing the tri-motor configuration, and 17% choosing the single-motor configuration. The number was reported to be 250,000 on 26 November.

Tesla released a video of Cybertruck pulling a rear-wheel-drive Ford F-150 uphill in a tug of war. Various news outlets pointed out this was simply due to the Cybertruck's heavier weight.

In January 2020, Automobile Magazine named Cybertruck the "Concept Car of the Year" for 2019.

Features 
The proposed truck uses self-leveling suspension which compensates for variable load and some models feature all-wheel drive. The company states that other standard features will include on-board power inverters for supplying both 120 and 240-volt electricity, allowing use of power tools without a portable generator. An air compressor for powering pneumatic tools is included. The exterior stainless steel sheet-metal is said to be bullet-resistant.  All vehicles are also planned to come with Tesla Autopilot, and they are planned to have the hardware capabilities for fully autonomous operation. As of 2019, Musk indicated that there would be a solar roof option which would add  of range per day.

Beginning in November 2019, Tesla has accepted Cybertruck pre-orders with a US$100 deposit, and used to offer a US$10,000 'full self-driving' option.

In April 2022 Elon Musk joined the new prototype of the Cybertruck onstage at the Cyber Rodeo Event in Texas, where he revealed a new detail – no door handles.  Musk said that the truck can sense your approach and "just knows that it needs to open the doors." Additionally Tesla has reportedly decided to allow the rear glass of the truck to drop, which would optimize the Cybertruck’s capability to carry cargo.

Interior 

The interior of the prototype unveiled on 21 November 2019 included a 17-inch center display, seating for 6 using two bench seats with the front middle seat being a fold-down center arm rest, a digital rear-view camera based mirror, a race car style steering yoke, and a dashboard with a surface resembling marble.  The rear middle seat folds down to allow loading long cargo extending into the cab from the vault (enclosed lockable bed). The "marble look" dashboard of the unveil prototype vehicle was a paper composite material made from "paper, wood-based fibers, natural wood pigments and non-petroleum based resins."

Vault (bed) 

It has sloped side walls, similar to a first-generation Honda Ridgeline, and a planned integral motorized roller shutter style tonneau cover to improve the aerodynamics of the vehicle. Because of the additional security this provides, Tesla terms this  enclosed space "the vault". It includes LED light strips along each side, an additional under-floor storage space behind the rear wheels, 120 and 240 V AC outlets, and a compressed air outlet for pneumatic tools. While one article claims that there is a pass-through to the cabin for long cargo, the displayed prototype lacks any corresponding opening in the front of the bed. The cabin's climate control was expected to be available in the vault for uses such as camping.

Design 

According to Musk, the design of the Cybertruck was inspired by Blade Runner and the Lotus Esprit driven by James Bond in The Spy Who Loved Me, which doubled as a submarine.
The Cybertruck uses stressed skin construction (termed an "exoskeleton" by Tesla)  like most modern aircraft, rather than the body-on-frame construction which is typical of trucks, as a standard vehicle frame would conflict with the under-floor battery pack.  It uses unusually thick  30x-series cold-rolled stainless steel body panels, which cannot be stamped like conventional automobile parts.  The panels can only be bent along straight lines, resulting in a very distinctive faceted design which has been called "low-poly" or likened to origami.  This material is the same material SpaceX (also owned by Musk) uses on their Starship Rocket, because it distributes stress more evenly and allows for more interior volume. Earlier design concepts for Cybertruck had included using titanium for the outer panels, but this was later switched to stainless steel for additional strength, using an alloy that was developed in-house by Tesla.

Specifications 
The powertrain for the dual motor AWD version is similar to the 2019 and newer "Raven" Tesla Model S and Model X, all of which have an inductive rear motor and the Model 3's permanent-magnet motor in front. Other versions are single-motor rear-wheel drive, or tri-motor with one front and two rear motors.

Similar to other Tesla models, the Cybertruck can be pre-ordered with Full Self-Driving software upgrade, adding an additional US$10,000 to the price of the configuration.

All models will have  of storage space, and a  cargo area.

In October 2021, Tesla removed the Cybertruck's pricing and specifications from its website without explanation while still accepting deposits.

At the 2022 Annual Shareholders meeting, Elon Musk stated that final specifications and pricing will be materially different from those unveiled on the concept vehicle in 2019.

Production 

, The Tesla Cybertruck production was scheduled to start in late 2021 and expand to offer more configurations in 2022. By 22 July 2020, Tesla had chosen Austin, Texas, (Gigafactory Texas) for the production of the Cybertruck, Model Y, and Semi. The factory will reportedly be open to the public and will include a boardwalk near the Colorado River, hiking trails, and biking trails.

By March 2021 a Giga Press die casting machine capable of  had been ordered for production of the Cybertruck rear chassis casting.

On August 9, 2021, the production of the Cybertruck was delayed to 2022 according to Tesla's website. In January 2022, the production was further delayed into early 2023 and then again to end of 2023, two years after the initial production target date.

Market potential 
In the United States, the total addressable market for full-sized pickup trucks is over two million vehicles per year. It has been argued that the Cybertruck will be able to take advantage of the Tesla Network of shared vehicles to generate an income stream, if the latter were to become available in the United States and worldwide.

Safety concerns
The Cybertruck's design has received criticism from automotive safety groups, including the Australasian New Car Assessment Program and the Euro NCAP, for not conforming to standards for pedestrian and cyclist safety. In its December 2019 form, the truck would likely not be street-legal in either Australia or the European Union. Particular concerns highlighted by these two bodies include the high stiffness of the "exoskeleton" exterior resulting in a lack of crumple zones, as well as the tall, flat front of the truck, which could increase the severity of leg injuries.

See also 
 Chevrolet Silverado EV
 Ford F-150 Lightning
 Rivian R1T
 GMC Hummer EV
 Lordstown Endurance

References

Further reading 
From Elon Musk's June 2018 "What would you love to see in a Tesla pickup truck?" Twitter thread:

External links 

 

Cars introduced in 2019
Upcoming car models
Cybertruck
Electric trucks
Pickup trucks
All-wheel-drive vehicles
Rear-wheel-drive vehicles